Nolan Kasper (born March 27, 1989) is a World Cup alpine ski racer from the United States. He competes in the technical events and specializes in the slalom.

Born in Morristown, New Jersey, Kasper began skiing at age three at Hidden Valley ski area in northern New Jersey, where his father was a ski instructor. Kasper is a graduate of the Burke Mountain Academy in Vermont and attends Dartmouth College in the off-season.

Kasper made his World Cup debut in November 2009 and was named for the 2010 U.S. Olympic team shortly after; he placed 24th in the Olympic slalom at Whistler. The following year, Kasper finished 15th in the slalom at the 2011 World Championships in Garmisch, Germany.

Kasper's best result to date is his first World Cup podium, a tie for second in the slalom at Kranjska Gora in March 2011. He finished in 17th place in the World Cup slalom standings for the 2011 season.  After hip surgery in September 2011, Kasper was off the snow until November. Despite the lack of training time, he just missed a podium with a fourth place in the slalom in early December at Beaver Creek, Colorado.

World Cup top-ten finishes
 1 podium – (1 SL)

Video
Universal Sports.com – Nolan Kasper – Adelboden, Switzerland – slalom: runs 1 & 2 – 2012-01-08

References

External links
 
 Nolan Kasper World Cup standings at the International Ski Federation
 
 
 Nolan Kasper.blogspot.com – personal blog
 US Ski Team.com – profile – Nolan Kasper
 Rossignol Skis – team – Nolan Kasper

1989 births
Alpine skiers at the 2010 Winter Olympics
American male alpine skiers
Living people
Sportspeople from Vermont
Olympic alpine skiers of the United States
People from Morristown, New Jersey
Alpine skiers at the 2014 Winter Olympics
Alpine skiers at the 2018 Winter Olympics